Živojin Bumbaširević (26 July 1920 Kruševac – 12 November 2008 Belgrade) was a Serbian orthopedic surgeon and traumatologist.

Biography
Bumbaširević was born 26 July 1920 in Kruševac, Yugoslavia into a family of Yugoslavian army officers. The family moved often and Bumbaširević attended schools in Sremska Mitrovica, Karlovac, and Prizren before graduating in 1938 and enrolling at the University of Belgrade's Faculty of Medicine. His studies were interrupted by World War II and he did not graduate until 1948. He passed his specialist exam in orthopedics in 1954 and defended his dissertation, The Value of Radiography in the Diagnosis of Hemophilic Arthropathy, in 1975 at the University of Belgrade. He started teaching orthopedic surgery and traumatology at the University of Belgrade in 1952 and was made a full professor in 1976. He also helped to establish the department of traumatology at the university.

Bumbaširević was assigned early on to rounds at an orthopedic surgery and traumatology clinic; at the time, there were no Serbian doctors specializing in orthopedic surgery and traumatology and Bumbaširević saw a gap in the literature and filled it.  He served as a ward doctor, head of the ward (1956-2008), assistant director (1961-1970), and director (1971-1980) of the Clinic for Orthopedic Surgery and Traumatology. From 1969 to 1986, he oversaw the orthopedic surgery and traumatology specialist exam at the University of Belgrade and from 1967 to 1986 oversaw the specialist exam for general surgery and orthopedic surgery at the Military Medical Academy. From 1980 to 1985, he was the head of the Department of Postgraduate Studies in Orthopedics and Traumatology. 

He made significant contributions to the cross sections of orthopedics, tuberculosis, and arthropathy. He made advances in spinal surgery,  particularly in tuberculosis of the spine, tuberculosis of the musculoskeletal system, hemophilic arthropathy, spinal trauma, bone tumors, and rehabilitation of paraplegic patients. The SIZ of Science of the Republic of Serbia and the Fund for Scientific Research of the Serbian Academy of Sciences and Arts were among the several organizations that funded his work. During his life, Bumbaširević wrote more than 350 articles about orthopaedic surgery and traumatology and organized a scientific conference called the Malignant Bone Tumors in 1989. Bumbaširević was the "only orthopedist who was a regular member of the Serbian Academy of Sciences and Art" at the time of his induction in 1983. 

Bumbaširević was a Francophile; he loved French literature and spoke French fluently. He had two sons, Vladimir and Marko, who are both doctors and members of the Serbian Academy of Sciences and Arts. Bumbaširević passed away on 12 November 2008 in Belgrade.

Memberships

 Serbian Medical Association, 1950
 Surgical Section, Serbian Medical Association, 1951
 Association of Orthopedic Surgeons and Traumatologists of Yugoslavia, 1954
 Traffic Medicine, Serbian Medical Association, 1957
 Association of Surgeons of Yugoslavia, 1968
 International Society of Surgery, 1971
 Medical Academy, Serbian Medical Association, 1971
 Medical Union for Emergency Medicine, Orthopedic Surgery and Traumatology, 1971
 International Society of Orthopaedic Surgery and Traumatology, 1975-1985
 Academy of Medical Sciences, Serbian Medical Association, 1976
 International College of Surgeons, 1977
 French Orthopaedic Association, 1982
 Association of Traumatologists of Hungary, 1982
 Association of Traumatologists of Italy, 1983
 Serbian Academy of Sciences and Arts (SANU), 1983
 Hungarian Orthopedic Association, 1984

 Yugoslav Association of Orthopedic Surgeons and Traumatologists (honorary), 1986
 Czechoslovak Association for Orthopedical Surgery and Traumatology, 1986
 Academia medica di Roma, 1988
 Association of Medical Societies of Yugoslavia (honorary), 1990
 Italian Society of Orthopaedics and Traumatology, 1990
 Committee for the Dictionary of Serbo-Croatian Literary and Folk Language, SANU, 1991
 Committee for Monitoring the Development of Medical Science in Serbia, SANU, 1991
 Committee for Emergency Traumatology, SANU, 1991
 Crown Council of Serbia, 1992 
 Society for Cultural Cooperation between France and Yugoslavia (1993)
 Committee for Language and Terminology of Medicine, SANU, 1996
 Austrian Society for Orthopaedics and Orthopaedic Surgery
 German Society for Orthopaedics and Trauma
 Committee for Serbian Language, SANU
 Council of the Center for Multidisciplinary Studies, University of Belgrade 
 World Association of Orthopedic Surgeons and Traumatologists

Leadership

 Founder and President, Interdepartmental Board for Medical Terminology, Serbian Academy of Sciences and Arts (SANU)
 President, Commission of the Ethics Committee, Serbian Medical Association (SLD)
 Executive Committee, Department of Surgery, Balkan Medical Union
 President, World Congress of Orthopedic Surgeons and Traumatologists (SICOT), 1988
 President, Scientific Committee, SICOT
 Board, Department of Medical Sciences for Monitoring the Development of Medical Sciences

 Founder and Chairman, Department of Traumatology, University of Belgrade
 National Delegate of Yugoslavia, SICOT, 1975-1985 
 National Delegate of Yugoslavia, Association of Orthopedic Surgeons and Traumatologists of the Mediterranean Countries and the Middle East, 1975-1982 
 Editorial Board, Revue de Chirurgie Orthopédique et Réparatrice de l'Appareil Moteur 
 Editorial Board, Serbian Archives of All Medicine 
 Editorial Board, Beiträge zur Orthopädie und Traumatologie 
 Editorial Board, Kharkiv Orthopedics and Traumatology 

 Editorial Board, Acta Orthopaedica Belgica 
 Editorial Board, Expert Act 
 President, Board of Retired University Professors, University of Belgrade 
 President, Terminology Seminar, University of Belgrade
 Founder and President, Interdepartmental Committees for Kopaonik Issues, 1996

Awards

 Medal of Merit to the People, 1973
 Knight of the Legion of Honour, 1977
 Order of Labour with a Golden Wreath (1991) 
 7th of July Award (1991)
 Purkiana Medal, Brno University
 Freyk Medal, Brno University
 Priorova Medal, Moscow State University's Research Institute of Traumatology and Orthopedics
 Academia medica di Roma Medal

 Diploma, International Society of Orthopaedic Surgery and Traumatology for contribution to the development of orthopedic surgery and traumatology
 Diploma, University of Belgrade Faculty of Medicine
 Diploma, School of Medicine, University of Zagreb
 Diploma, University of Niš School of Medicine
 Diploma, University of Skopje
 Diploma, University of Belgrade Faculty of Dentistry
 Diploma, Yugoslav Association of Orthopedic Surgeons and Traumatologists (JUOT)

 Gold and silver wood, JUOT
 Charter, Serbian Medical Association
 Diploma, Association of Medical Societies of Yugoslavia
 Diploma, City of Belgrade
 Knight of Grand Cross in the Order of the White Eagle

References

1920 births
2008 deaths
University of Belgrade Faculty of Medicine alumni
Serbian orthopedic surgeons
Yugoslav surgeons
Members of the Serbian Academy of Sciences and Arts
Chevaliers of the Légion d'honneur
People from Kruševac
People from Belgrade
People from Belgrade in health professions
Physicians from Belgrade
Scientists from Belgrade
Serbian surgeons
Traumatologists